The Men's 50m breaststroke event at the 2010 South American Games was held on March 27, with the heats at 10:07 and the Final at 18:0.

Medalists

Records

Results

Heats

Final

References
Heats
Final

Breast 50m M